This page lists the World Best Year Performance in the year 1992 in the men's decathlon. One of the main events during this season were the 1992 Olympic Games in Barcelona, Spain, where the competition started on August 5, 1992, and ended on August 6, 1992.

Records

1992 World Year Ranking

See also
1992 Hypo-Meeting
1992 Décastar

References
decathlon2000
apulanta
digilander

1992
Decathlon Year Ranking, 1992